Cynthia Irwin-Williams (April 14, 1936 – June 15, 1990) was an archaeologist of the prehistoric American Southwest.  She received a B.A. in Anthropology from Radcliffe College in 1957; the next year she received a M.A. in the same field.  In 1963 she completed her educational career in Anthropology with a PhD. from Harvard University.  Beginning her career in the 1950s, Irwin-Williams was considered a groundbreaker for women in archaeology, like her friend and supporter Hannah Marie Wormington.

Archaeological career
She worked with her brother, Henry Irwin, a fellow archaeologist, in Colorado from the mid-1950s to 1960. In 1966 Irwin-Williams and her brother published a book of her findings from the Magic Mountain site excavation performed for the Peabody Museum of Harvard University in 1959–1960.  They also worked on the nearby and related LoDaisKa site between 1958 and 1960.

In the 1960s she defined the Picosa culture, an Archaic culture of people from three locations with interconnected artifacts and lifestyles.  It was named by Irwin-Williams for those areas: Pinto Basin (PI), Cochise tradition (CO) and San Jose (SA), which all together is "Picosa".   Irwin-Williams developed the sequence of Archaic culture for the Oshara tradition, which followed the Picosa culture, during her work in the Arroyo Cuervo area of northwestern New Mexico.  Irwin contended that the Ancient Pueblo People, or Anasazi, developed, at least in part, from the Oshara.

In 1962, Irwin-Williams led the team that first excavated the Hueyatlaco site in Mexico. The site became mired in controversy about the age of human habitation in the site, and Irwin-Williams never published a final report on the excavation despite decades of research.

Personal life
Cynthia Irwin-Williams was born April 14, 1936, in Denver, Colorado. After a long chronic illness, Irwin-Williams died on June 15, 1990, in Reno, Nevada.

Publications
Irwin, Henry J.; Irwin, Cynthia C.  (1966). Excavations at Magic Mountain: A Diachronic Study of Plains-Southwest Relations. Denver Museum of Natural History Proceedings Number 12. October 20, 1966.

Irwin-Williams, Cynthia, and C.Vance Haynes, Jr. (1970). "Climatic Change and Early Population Dynamics in the Southwestern United States." Quaternary Research. 1(1):59-71.

Irwin-Williams, Cynthia. (September 1973). "The Oshara Tradition: Origins of Anasazi Culture." Eastern New Mexico University Contributions in Anthropology. 5(1) Portales: Eastern New Mexico University Paleo-Indian Institute.

Irwin-Williams, Cynthia. (1979). "Post-Pleistocene Archaeology, 7000-2000 B.C." in Handbook of North American Indians. Washington, D.C.: Smithsonian Institution Press. 9 Southwest:31-42.

Irwin-Williams, Cynthia; Shelley, Phillip H. (editors) (1980). Investigations at the Salmon Site: The Structure of Chacoan Society in the Northern Southwest. Portales: Eastern New Mexico University Publications in Anthropology.

Irwin-Williams, Cynthia; Baker, Larry L. Baker (editors) (1991). Anasazi Puebloan Adaptation in Response to Climatic Stress: Prehistory of the Middle Rio Puerco Valley. pp. 325–341. On file, Bureau of Land Management, Albuquerque, NM.

References

1936 births
1990 deaths
American women archaeologists
20th-century American women scientists
Radcliffe College alumni
20th-century women writers
20th-century American archaeologists